The Hobart Synagogue is a heritage-listed synagogue located in 59 Argyle Street, Hobart, Tasmania, Australia. The synagogue is the oldest synagogue building in Australia and is a rare example of the Egyptian Revival style of synagogue architecture. The Egyptian Revival building was constructed in 1845. The trapezoidal shape of the windows and the columns with lotus capitals are characteristic of the Egyptian Revival style. Currently the Hobart Synagogue has regular  Orthodox and Progressive services.

The land on which the synagogue stands was originally part of the garden of former convict Judah Solomon. It has a seating capacity of 150 and features hard benches at the back of the building for the Jewish convicts who in the early days were marched in under armed guard. The synagogue is listed on the Tasmanian Heritage Register.

History 
The building of a synagogue was raised as the Hobart Jewish community began to emerge in the 1830s. The Hobart Hebrew Congregation Synagogue was consecrated on 4 July 1845. The building was designed by Hobart Town architect James Thomson, who was a Scottish convict who was pardoned in 1829.

Although several synagogues and churches were built in the Egyptian Revival style in the early nineteenth century, only a few are known to survive, they include  the Downtown Presbyterian Church, Nashville, the First Presbyterian Church, New York, the Old Synagogue at Canterbury, England and the Launceston Synagogue.

Current usage 
The synagogue is the focal point of Jewish culture in Hobart, and is the only structure owned by the community.

The community is welcome to all Jews, and currently runs Orthodox and Progressive services. 

The Tasmanian community reached a low point in the early 1970s when the census recorded fewer than 100 Jews in Hobart.   The  recorded 376 Jews in Tasmania.

Gallery

See also

 List of synagogues in Australia and New Zealand
 Oldest synagogues in the world
 History of the Jews in Australia

References

External links

 
 Hobart Hebrew Congregation Digital Archives

Further reading

Egyptian Revival architecture
Orthodox synagogues in Australia
Reform Judaism in Australia
Synagogues in Australia
Buildings and structures in Hobart
Tourist attractions in Hobart
History of Tasmania
Religious buildings and structures in Tasmania
Synagogues completed in 1845
1845 establishments in Australia
Tasmanian Heritage Register
Union for Progressive Judaism